Featherstone Lions are an amateur rugby league club from Featherstone, West Yorkshire who play in the National Conference League and the Yorkshire Men's League.
The juniors (U7 - U18) play in the Yorkshire Junior & Youth League. 
The club also has open age women and 3 girls' teams.

Their home ground is the Millpond Stadium. They are the town's second side, after Featherstone Rovers who play in the Championship.

History
Featherstone Lions are the result of a merger between Jubilee Hotel and Traveller's amateur sides in the early 1990s.

Featherstone's first season, 1994–95, was in the CMS Yorkshire league First Division. At the end of the 1995–96 season, they had won promotion to the Yorkshire League Premier Division and finished 2nd in the table.

They were accepted into National Conference League Division 2 for the 1996–97 season. In 1997–98, Featherstone Lions won promotion to NCL Division 1 as champions, won the Yorkshire Cup beating Siddal in a bad tempered final at Thrum Hall and beat Doncaster in the third round of the Challenge Cup before losing to Hull Kingston Rovers.

Featherstone reached the fourth round of the Challenge Cup, in 1998–99, after beating Hemel Stags before playing Super League side Halifax.

In 2000–01, Featherstone reached the National Cup Final before losing to Thatto Heath at Spotland Stadium, Rochdale.

The following year, the Lions narrowly avoided relegation but in 2002-03 were promoted to NCL Premier League. However, they were relegated back to NCL Division 1 in their first season and followed this with another relegation back down to NCL Division 2.

Following this double relegation, Featherstone withdrew from National Conference to rebuild the open age team. In 2006, they joined National League Three which they won a year later under its new name RLC National Division.

Juniors

Featherstone run a junior section in the Yorkshire Junior League with the following teams included:

Under 7s;
Under 8s;
Under 9s;
Under 10s;
Under 11s;
Under 12s;
Under 12 girls;
Under 13s;
Under 14s;
Under 14 girls;
Under 15s;
Under 16s;
Under 16 girls;
Under 18s;

Club honours
 NCL Division 1: 2016–Present
 NCL Division 2: 2015-2016
 RLC National Division: 2007

Former players
Richard Agar
Tom Briscoe
Jack Briscoe
Joe Westerman
Richard Owen
Zak Hardaker
Rob Burrow
Liam Watts
Richard Whiting
Brett Ferres
Danny Kirmond
Josh Hardcastle
Luke Briscoe
Gareth Gale
Jimmy Beckett
Jack Townend
Jamie Rooney
Simon Tuffs

References

External links
 

BARLA teams
Rugby League Conference teams
Sport in the City of Wakefield
Rugby league teams in West Yorkshire
Rugby clubs established in 1994
1994 establishments in England
English rugby league teams